Luis Fernando Vergara Meyland (born 13 May 1970), known as Fernando Vergara, is a retired Chilean football forward, who was nicknamed El Zamorano de los Pobres during his career. He is currently coaching Universidad de Concepción in the Primera B de Chile.

Career
A product of Audax Italiano youth system, in 1990 he played for Swiss side  before returning to Chile and joining Universidad de Chile.

Vergara obtained a total number of six caps for the Chile national team, scoring three goals between 1996 and 1997. 

Following his playing career, Vergara became a football manager and led C.D. Huachipato to the quarter-finals in the 2008 Torneo Clausura.

In 1997, he had a trial with English Premier League club Crystal Palace and then had talks with Everton, but nothing came of either of these approaches and Vergara never played a competitive game in England.

Career statistics

International goals

Personal life
From 2009 to 2010 he performed as a football commentator for the channel Canal del Fútbol.

Honours

Player
Colo-Colo
 Primera División de Chile (3): 1996, 1997, 1998

References

External links

1970 births
Living people
Footballers from Santiago
Chilean footballers
Chilean expatriate footballers
Chile international footballers
1997 Copa América players
Expatriate footballers in Switzerland
Expatriate footballers in Spain
Expatriate footballers in Peru
Audax Italiano footballers
Universidad de Chile footballers
C.D. Arturo Fernández Vial footballers
Colo-Colo footballers
C.D. Antofagasta footballers
Rayo Vallecano players
Club Universitario de Deportes footballers
Unión Española footballers
Primera B de Chile players
Chilean Primera División players
Segunda División players
Peruvian Primera División players
Association football forwards
Chilean football managers
Chilean Primera División managers
Primera B de Chile managers
Magallanes managers
Huachipato managers
Deportes La Serena managers
Deportes Iquique managers
Deportes Temuco managers
Cobreloa managers
San Marcos de Arica managers
Unión Española managers
Deportes Antofagasta managers
Deportes Puerto Montt managers
Universidad de Concepción managers
Chilean expatriate sportspeople in Switzerland
Chilean expatriate sportspeople in Spain
Chilean expatriate sportspeople in Peru
Association football commentators
Chilean association football commentators 
Canal del Fútbol color commentators